Events in the year 1450 in Norway.

Incumbents
Monarch: Charles I (until June); Christian I (starting August 4)

Events
 August 4 – Christian I becomes King of Norway after the  abdication of Charles I. From this date the House of Oldenburg would remain on the Norwegian throne until 1814.
August 29 - The Treaty of Bergen is signed. Danmark and Norway became a union of two equal kingdoms.

Arts and literature

Births

Deaths
Aslak Bolt, archbishop (born c. 1380).

References

Norway